128 New King's Road is a Grade II listed house at 128 New King's Road, Fulham, London, built in the early 18th century.

It is a few doors away from Northumberland House and Claybrook House.

References

External links

Grade II listed buildings in the London Borough of Hammersmith and Fulham
Houses in the London Borough of Hammersmith and Fulham
New King's Road
Grade II listed houses in London
Houses completed in the 18th century